Loliondo town situated in northern Ngorongoro District of Arusha Region in Northern Tanzania. Together with neighbouring Wasso village, it hosts the district offices and forms the commercial centre of Loliondo division. Loliondo is the seat of the current District Commissioner for Ngorongoro.

The ethnic make-up of the area was traditionally Maasai with pastoralism the main land-use. In more recent years the Chaga and Warusha ethnic groups have increased, leading to an increase in cultivation in the valley which the village occupies. There is also a significant population of Sonjo agro-pastoralists due to the Sonjo majority in areas to the east.

Populated places in Arusha Region
Ngorongoro District